Andorra competed at the 2022 Winter Olympics in Beijing, China, from 4 to 20 February 2022.

On 19 January 2022, the Andorran Olympic Committee announced a team of four athletes (two per gender) competing in two sports. During the announcement, it was also announced the Andorran flag would be carried by a volunteer at the opening ceremony as the alpine skiers would not arrive till later and the cross-country skiers had competition the next day. However, two days later, snowboarder Maeva Estevez was added to the team and named as flagbearer at the opening ceremony. This increased the team size to five athletes (two men and three women). A volunteer served as the flagbearer during the closing ceremony.

Competitors
The following is the list of number of competitors who participated at the Games per sport/discipline.

Alpine skiing

By meeting the basic qualification standards, Andorra qualified one male and one female alpine skier.

Cross-country skiing

Andorra qualified two male and two female cross-country skiers, but chose to only use one quota per gender.

Due to high winds and adverse weather conditions, the men's 50 km freestyle competition on 19 February was shortened to 28.4 km.

Snowboarding

Andorra received a reallocated quota for the women's snowboard cross event.

See also
Andorra at the 2022 Winter Paralympics

References

Nations at the 2022 Winter Olympics
2022
Winter Olympics